The United States Senate special election of 1949 in New York was held on November 8, 1949. On June 28, 1949, incumbent senator Robert F. Wagner resigned due to ill health. On July 7, John Foster Dulles was appointed by Governor Thomas Dewey to fill the vacancy temporarily.

The Republican State Committee nominated Dulles to succeed himself. The Democratic State Committee nominated former Governor Herbert H. Lehman. The Liberal Party endorsed Lehman. The American Labor Party made no nominations and urged its members not to vote for any candidate. The Democratic/Liberal ticket was elected and Dulles was defeated.

General election

Candidates
 Herbert H. Lehman, former Governor of New York (Democratic and Liberal)
 John Foster Dulles, incumbent Senator (appointed by Governor Dewey) and diplomat (Republican)

Results

References

New York 1949
New York 1949
1949 Special
New York Special
United States Senate Special
United States Senate 1949